The 2019–20 Tennessee Volunteers basketball team represented the University of Tennessee in the 2019–20 NCAA Division I men's basketball season. The Volunteers were led by fifth-year head coach Rick Barnes. The team played its home games at Thompson–Boling Arena in Knoxville, Tennessee, as a member of the Southeastern Conference. They finished the season 17–14, 9–9 in SEC play to finish in eighth place. They were set to take on Alabama in the second round of the SEC tournament. However, the remainder of the SEC Tournamament was cancelled amid the COVID-19 pandemic.

Previous season
The Vols finished the 2018-19 NCAA Division I men's basketball season 31–6, 15–3 in SEC play to earn a share of the SEC regular season championship. As the No. 2 seed in the SEC tournament, they defeated Mississippi State and Kentucky before losing to Auburn in the championship game. They received an at-large bid to the NCAA tournament as the No. 2 seed in the South region. There the Volunteers defeated Colgate and Iowa in the Second Round before being upset by Purdue in the Sweet Sixteen.

Offseason

Departures

Coaching changes
In April 2019, associate head coach Rob Lanier was hired as the new head coach at Georgia State. Barnes hired Kim English as a replacement later that month.

Incoming transfers

2019 recruiting class

2020 recruiting class

Preseason

SEC media poll
The SEC media poll was released on October 15, 2019.

Preseason All-SEC teams
The Volunteers had one player selected to the preseason all-SEC teams.

Second Team

Lamonté Turner

Roster

Depth chart

Schedule and results

|-
!colspan=12 style=|Exhibition

|-
!colspan=12 style=|Regular season

|-
!colspan=12 style=| SEC Tournament
|- style="background:#bbbbbb"
| style="text-align:center"|March 12, 20201:00 pm, SECN
| style="text-align:center"| (8)
| vs. (9) AlabamaSecond round
| colspan=5 rowspan=1 style="text-align:center"|Cancelled due to the COVID-19 pandemic
| style="text-align:center"|Bridgestone ArenaNashville, TN
|-

Ranking

*AP does not release post-NCAA Tournament rankings

References

Tennessee
Tennessee Volunteers basketball seasons
Volunteers
Volunteers